Risaralda or "Rizaralde", is a landlocked department of Colombia. It is located in the western central region of the country and part of the Paisa Region. Its capital is Pereira.

It was divided  from the department of Caldas in 1966. Risaralda is very well known for the high quality of its coffee, and a booming industry: clothes, food, trading of goods and services.

The territory is very mountainous and has many kinds of climates in a very small area. Its proximity to harbours such as Goodventure on the Pacific Ocean and to the biggest cities in Colombia – Bogota, Cali, Medellin – makes it a fast-growing economic centre.

Geography

The department's drainage system consists of two major basins, the Cauca River and the San Juan River. Physiographical formations are covered by the volcanic massifs of the central and western mountain ranges, flat and narrow valleys formed by the natural river basins of the Otún River, the Cauca River, Risaralda River, and La Vieja River.

Its main stages are: Nevado de Santa Isabel (Pereira), Cerro de Tatamá (Sanctuary), Cerro de Caramanta (Mistrató), Alto de las Palomas (Pueblo Rico), Alto de Pelahuevos (APIA), Blade la Serna (Mistrató), San Juan Blade (APIA), Blade of the Content (APIA), Blade Tribune (Pereira), Alto del Nudo and Morro Azul (Pereira), Alto de la Campana (APIA) and the Crystalline High (Belen de Umbria.)

The soils of the department have their origin in igneous rocks and volcanic ash derived from sedimentary rocks and alluvial and colluvial materials. According to these materials, located in the county soil units: manila, Parnaz or 200, unit 10 or Chinchiná and Malabar, being the most extensive in the coffee or Chinchiná unit 10.

As for the classification agrological (crops) 6.4% of the departmental area (except the municipalities of Pueblo Rico, Belén de Umbria Mistrató and have not agrological study) corresponds to classes II, III, and IV, 77.2% to class V, VI, VII, and 16.4% to class VIII and in appearance agrological mainly found Mj units and Fn., which occupy 58.6% of the total area considered suitable for a variety of crops and forests.

In the department there are a variety of life zones, which are distributed as follows: BMH-PM (40.3%), BMH-MB (28.7%), BP-pm (9.4%) and the rest (21.5%) are bs -T-T bh, bh-T, bh-PM, bp-MB, BH-F, bp-M, among others.

History

Before the European conquest the territory was inhabited by the Quimbaya and Caramanta people. The first conquistadores arrived in the 1537 expedition headed by Sebastián de Belalcázar.

Some Spanish towns were founded, but the decline of the indigenous population and low immigration of Europeans led to Risaralda sitting largely abandoned until the mid-nineteenth century, when coffee cultivation arrived.

During the colonial and early years of the Republic, the region was subject to Popayán Province. In 1821 it became part of the Cauca Department. In 1857 it became part of the Federal State of Cauca. In 1905, Risaralda was attached to the Caldas Department. In 1966 it was created as a separate department with its capital in Pereira.

Municipalities

 Apía
 Balboa
 Belén de Umbría
 Dosquebradas
 Guática
 La Celia
 La Virginia
 Marsella
 Mistrató
 Pereira
 Pueblo Rico
 Quinchía
 Santa Rosa de Cabal
 Santuario

References

External links

http://www.risaralda.gov.co

 
Departments of Colombia
States and territories established in 1966